Filippo Baldi Rossi (born October 26, 1991) is an Italian professional basketball player for Pallacanestro Reggiana of the Italian Lega Basket Serie A (LBA). Standing at 2.07 m (6 ft. 9 in.), he plays at the Power forward and center positions.

Professional career

Clubs
Filippo Baldi Rossi began to play with the senior team of Virtus Bologna at the age 17.

During the 2010–11 and 2011–12 seasons he played on loan to Perugia Basket. In 2012 he went to Auxilium Torino, where he played for only one season. In 2013 he signed a contract with Aquila Basket Trento in Serie A2 Basket. He still plays in the Trento's major basketball club in the Italian LBA.

On February 3, 2016, during a match of the Last 32 round in EuroCup against Pallacanestro Reggiana, he was severely injured on the left knee. and he had to undergo an operation on the front crusader. For that reason he blasted the rest of the season. A long rehabilitation took at the Isokinetic Centre in Bologna, Italy, where he got a full recovery after the operation.

On November 30, 2017, Baldi Rossi signed a deal with Segafredo Virtus Bologna. His contract ran through 2019. He signed a two-year deal with Pallacanestro Reggiana on July 16, 2020.

National team
Baldi Rossi played the 2011 FIBA Europe Under-20 Championship in 2011 with the Italy national under-20 basketball team, where he won the silver medal.

In 2017 Filippo Baldi Rossi officially entered into the sperimental Italian Senior Basketball Team. He was in the 12s of coach Ettore Messina for EuroBasket 2017 in Israel and Turkey, because of Davide Pascolo who missed EuroBasket with a right knee injury.

Honours

Club
Virtus Bologna
Basketball Champions League: 2018–19

International
Italy Under-20
2011 FIBA Europe Under-20 Championship: Silver

References

External links
Filippo Baldi Rossi at legabasket.it 
Filippo Baldi Rossi at fiba.com
Filippo Baldi Rossi at eurobasket.com
Filippo Baldi Rossi at eurocupbasketball.com

1991 births
Living people
Aquila Basket Trento players
Auxilium Pallacanestro Torino players
Centers (basketball)
Italian men's basketball players
Lega Basket Serie A players
Pallacanestro Reggiana players
Power forwards (basketball)
Sportspeople from Modena
Virtus Bologna players